Çamiçi High Plateau is a mountain resort at a high plateau located in Niksar district of Tokat Province, Turkey.

The place is covered by dense pine wood, and takes its name (literally "In the Pine Wood") from the vegetation. It is a preferred tourist destination due to its relatively cool climate in the summer.

There are nearly 800 households at the high plateau.  The location features a motel, ten wooden cabins to rent, a  camping park for  25 caravans and 100 tents, It offers outdoor activities like orienteering and paragliding. A festival is held yearly at the high plateau.

References

Yaylas in Turkey
Landforms of Tokat Province
Tourist attractions in Tokat Province
Niksar